Henri James Nathaniel Charles, Baron de Rothschild (26 July 1872 – 12 October 1947) was a French playwright who wrote under the pen names André Pascal, Charles des Fontaines, and P.-L. Naveau. He was also qualified as a  physician (although he never actually practiced medicine), a  philanthropist, and an entrepreneur.

He was a scion of the English branch of the Rothschild family, being the son of James Edouard de Rothschild (1844–1881) and Thérèse von Rothschild (1847–1931). His paternal grandfather was Nathaniel de Rothschild, originally from London, the founder of the French wine-making branch of the Rothschild family.

He married, in 1895, Mathilde Sophie Henriette von Weissweiller (1872-1926). They had three children:
 James-Henri de Rothschild (1896-1984), who married, in 1923, Claude Dupont (1904-1964) then, in 1966, Yvette Choquet (born in 1939)
 Nadine de Rothschild (1898-1958), who married in 1919 Mr. Adrien Thierry (1885-1961)
 Philippe de Rothschild (1902-1988), who married, in 1935, Elisabeth Pelletier de Chambure (1902-1945) and, in 1954, Pauline Fairfax Potter (1908-1976)

References

External links 

Writers from Paris
1872 births
1947 deaths
20th-century French dramatists and playwrights
19th-century French Jews
Henri de Rothschild
French winemakers
French racing drivers
Commandeurs of the Légion d'honneur